Two ships of the United States Navy have borne the name USS Miller.

, was a  launched in 1973, reclassified in 1975, and struck in 1995.

See also

 , a future 
 
 
 

United States Navy ship names